McIntyre Road (and its northern sections as Kings Road and Bolivar Road) is an arterial road crossing through northern and northeastern suburbs of Adelaide in South Australia. It is designated route A18.

Route
Kings Road crosses the northern suburbs connecting Port Wakefield Road and Main North Road immediately north of Parafield Airport across the southern edge of Salisbury. The northern part of Kings Road passes through residential areas and crosses the Little Para River. East of the railway lines, the character changes to industrial manufacturing, and the Parafield Airport.

McIntyre Road continues east of Main North Road with a residential character again. It rises up the face of the Adelaide Hills through a corridor of native bushland and sweeps past the Golden Grove development of the 1980s to North East Road at Modbury. Much of the McIntyre Road corridor was originally reserved as part of the 1960s Metropolitan Adelaide Transport Study (MATS Plan).

History
McIntyre Road was opened in 1989, funded primarily by the Australian Government.

In 2016, the western end of Kings Road was realigned so that instead of it ending at a tee junction with Bolivar Road just short of Port Wakefield Road, the two roads meet at a large roundabout where Kings Road continues to Port Wakefield Road, enabling easier traffic flow to and from Kings Road. An adjacent interchange with the North–South Motorway was opened in 2020. Prior to this alteration, route A18 included 300m of Bolivar Road to connect the end of Kings Road to Port Wakefield Road.

Major intersections

References

Roads in Adelaide